Byasa alcinous, the Chinese windmill, is a butterfly of the family Papilionidae.

Description
The basic colour of the wings is black or dark brown. The hindwings have long tails and a chain of red spots at the edges. The thorax and the abdomen are mainly black on the upperside and the underside, with several black spots, while the other areas are red.
Adults are on wing from May to August in two generations.

The larvae feed on Aristolochia species including A. mandshhuriensis, A. debilis and A. manchuriensis. Subspecies has been recorded on A. shimadai, A. liukiuensis, A. kankauensis, A. elegans, A. debilis, A. kaempferii, A. onoei, A. tagala, Cocculus trilobus and Metaplexis chinensis. The species overwinters as a pupa.

Distribution
This species can be found in the Asian part of the Palaearctic realm and partially in the Indomalayan realm, from Bhutan, and eastern China to the southern Ussuri region, Korea and Japan.

Habitat
Byasa alcinous is present in mixed broadleaved forests.

Subspecies
 B. a. alcinous
 B. a. confusus (Rothschild, 1895) (Ussuri)
 B. a. yakushimana (Esaki & Umeno, 1929) (Japan)
 B. a. loochooana (Rothschild, 1896) (Japan)
 B. a. miyakoensis (Omoto, 1960) (Japan)
 B. a. bradanus (Fruhstorfer, 1908) (Japan)
 B. a. mansonensis (Fruhstorfer, 1901) (south-central and south-eastern China, Taiwan)

Gallery

References

External links

Global Butterfly Information System Syntype text, images of subspecies alcinous, nana, pacifica and parvummaculatus.
 Panoramio
 Atrophaneura alcinous

Byasa
Taxa named by Johann Christoph Friedrich Klug
Butterflies described in 1836